Two Thousand Miles is the fourth album by American singer/songwriter Owen Temple. It was released in 2008 on El Paisano Records.

Track listing

Credits

Musicians
 Owen Temple - Acoustic and Electric guitar, Harmonica
 Lloyd Maines - Electric guitar, Pedal steel, Mandolin, Dobro  
 David Grissom - Electric guitar  
 Glenn Fukunaga - bass, upright bass  
 Riley Osbourn - Hammond B3 organ
 Richard Bowden - Fiddle
 David Sanger - Drums  
 Gordy Quist - Harmony vocals on "You Want to Wear That Ring," "Can't Drink Enough to Sing," "You Don't Have to be Lonely," and "The Pluto Blues" 
 Terri Hendrix Harmony vocals on "Two Thousand Miles," "Demolition Derby," and "Like We Still Care"  
 Bob Livingston - Harmony vocals on "Red Wine and Tequila," "Swear It Off Again," "Can't Quit Loving You," "On the Lonesome Road," and "Rivers Run From Many Waters"

Production
Produced by Lloyd Maines
Engineered by Cris Burns
Recorded at Bismeaux Studio, Austin, Texas

Artwork
Art Direction/Design by Shauna Dodds
Photography by Eric Ryan Anderson
Photography by Todd V. Wolfson

Charts

Releases

External links 
Owen Temple website
El Paisano Records website

References 

Owen Temple albums
2008 albums